Qingdao Hainiu Football Club (known as Hai-niu or literally Sea Bull) is a professional Chinese football club that currently participates in the Chinese Super League division under licence from the Chinese Football Association (CFA). The team is based in Qingdao, Shandong and their home stadium is the Qingdao Tiantai Stadium that has a seating capacity of 20,525. Their current owners are the privately owned cable manufacturer Qingdao Jonoon Group.

The club was founded as Shandong Economic and Trade Commission Football Club in 1990 and started at the bottom of the Chinese football league pyramid in the third tier. On December 31, 1993 they became the first professional club in Qingdao and changed its name to Qingdao Hainiu. They went on to establish themselves as a top-tier club and won their first major trophy in 2002 by winning the Chinese FA Cup on November 16, 2002 when they beat Liaoning Bird. In the mid-2010s the club started to decline and fell down two leagues, being relegated twice in 4 seasons.

History
Qingdao Jonoon Football Club started out as Shandong Economic and Trade Commission F.C. in 1990 by some retired footballers at the corporation affiliated with Shandong economic and trade commission associated with some workers at Qingdao Municipal Sanatorium. After playing in the Chinese Yi League for three seasons, the club finished as Second Division Champions and won promotion to the Chinese Jia-B League in 1992 – the club's first league title. As required by Chinese Football Association, on 31 December 1993, the club set up a professional system and became the first professional football club in Qingdao. Subsequently, the club was renamed to Qingdao Manatee F.C., the Chinese name for manatee, "海牛 (hainiu, literally 'sea bull')", also being the nickname for the foghorn in Tuandao Lighthouse due to the sound it emits.

Qingdao Manatee finished as the Chinese Jia-B League Champions and won promotion to the Chinese Jia-A League in 1994. In the following season, the club was invited to compete the Tainland Queen's Cup and achieved the third place with 2 wins, 1 draw and 1 loss – the club's first international honour. However, in domestic league the club was relegated to the Division 1B after losing an epic battle against Sichuan Quanxing 2–3. In 1996, the club appointed Wu Hongyue as manager, who led the team to a second-place league finish and regained promotion to the Division 1A. Soon after that season, the state-run tobacco producer – Qingdao Etsong Group started to invest the club, which changed its name to Qingdao Etsong Hainiu F.C. the following year. From 1997 season, the club became a regular member of the top division and was never relegated since then. On November 16, 2002, after beating Liaoning Bird 2–0 in Yizhong Sports Center, the club won its first major trophy: the 2002 Chinese FA Cup.

After eight-year management by Etsong Group, the club was transferred to a privately owned cable manufacturer – Qingdao Jonoon Group and dropped the long term icon "Hainiu" from its name in December 2004. The club's new owner slashed down the budget greatly, sold up all notable players and assigned the former Jinan taishan's coach Yin Tiesheng as manager, who is famous for his defending style. In the following three seasons, Yin brought Jonoon to stay firmly in the middle position of the league. In 2008, after Yin's assignment as assistant coach of China Olympic team, the club promoted the assistant coach Guo Kanfeng as head coach and retained eighth place in that season. After six-round terrible management in the following season, Guo was sacked by the club and former notable Serbian coach Slobodan Santrač took over as manager. Though finished at thirteenth place, the team played a beautiful attacking soccer style and even the attacking combination was duplicated by the National Team head coach Gao Hongbo. Soon after 2009 season, the club surprisingly sacked Santrač and reassigned Guo as actual head coach, with Dragan Jovanovič assigned as nominal head coach due to Gu's lack of qualification. In 2010, the club endured a horrible season and lost the last match against Hangzhou Greentown 0–1, but surprisingly survived from relegation in the fourteenth place.

In the 2013 league season the team's manager Chang Woe-Ryong was sacked from the club despite the team sitting in tenth. The club would experience relegation at the end of the season and the club's owners publicly declared that one of their own players in Gabriel Melkam was match fixing, which resulted in their relegation. Gabriel Melkam would claim that the accusations of match-fixing were a ploy by the owners not to pay his wages and he took his case to FIFA. While this was going on further claims of mismanagement would arise with the transfer of the club's captain Liu Jian move to Guangzhou Evergrande when it was discovered that the club had forged an extension in his contract. In the 2014 league season the club were found guilty for breaking the Chinese FA's rules and were deducted 7 points.

In 2016 Qingdao Jonoon finished second-to-last in the League One and were relegated to the third level of the Chinese league system. Qingdao Huanghai, another team in the League One in the same city, started to get more attention. Qingdao had no more foreign players by 2019. In the 2019 season, there were deducted six points for a rule violation.

Ownership and naming history

Crest and colours

The club's first choice of home kit colors were all red and they did not have a badge until they won promotion. When they won promotion they changed the club's home kit colors to yellow and their name to Qingdao Manatee (海牛), which Chinese name also literally means "Sea Bull", which directly influenced their badge design, which was simply a bull. The owners Etsong Group decided to rebrand the club once more with a new badge, which was a simple striped design with the new owners name at the top while the new kit colors became red and white. With Jonoon Group coming in as their new sponsor the club changed their colors once again to blue while using red as their new away colors. When the Jonoon Group took over they incorporated their own logo of two tigers merged as the club's new badge and chose orange as the new home colors because they believe it represents "passion and energy" as well as also being the same color of their own brand.

Kit evolution

Grounds

The current home stadium of Qingdao Jonoon Football Club is Qingdao Tiantai Stadium, which is also known as Qingdao First Stadium. Tiantai Stadium is a multi-purpose stadium built in 1933 as Qingdao Municipal Stadium, and was renamed Qingdao First Stadium in 1955. Qingdao Jonoon started to play in Tiantai Stadium in the first three professional seasons, and resided there permanently since 2007.

Players

Current squad

Out on loan

Club Officials

Current Coaching staff

Managerial history
Information correct as of end of 2013 league season.

  Wang Shouye 1990–91
  Liu Guojiang 1992
  Wang Shouye 1993–94
  Xu Yonglai 1995
  Wu Hongyue 1996
  Liu Guojiang 1997
  Li Yingfa 1998
  Kim Jung-Nam 1999
  Guo Zuojin (Caretaker) 1999
  Wang Shouye (Caretaker) 1999
  Yang Weijian (Caretaker) 1999
  Miroljub Ostojić 2000
  Guo Zuojin 2000–01
  Lee Jang-Soo 2002–03
  Tang Lepu 2004
  Wang Weiman (Caretaker) 2004
  Yin Tiesheng 2005–07
  Guo Kanfeng 2008–09
  Slobodan Santrač April 30, 2009 – Nov 11, 2009
  Dragan Jovanovič 2010 The actual manager is Guo Kanfeng
  Ji Yujie 2010 The actual manager is Guo Kanfeng
  Chang Woe-Ryong Jan 1, 2011 – Dec 31, 2011
  Blaž Slišković Jan 20, 2012 – March 13, 2012
  Yang Weijian (Caretaker) 2012
  Chang Woe-Ryong May 24, 2012 – Aug 20, 2013
  Li Yingfa (Caretaker) Aug 20, 2013 – Sept 5, 2013 Caretaker
  Goran Stevanović Sept 5, 2013 – Oct 30, 2013
  Li Xiaopeng Oct 30, 2013–22 July 2014
  Tomaž Kavčič 24 July 2014 – 5 October 2015
  Dragan Stančić (Caretaker) 5 October 2015 – 15 December 2015
  Su Maozhen 15 December 2015 – 6 September 2016
  Yin Tiesheng 6 September 2016 – 25 December 2017
  Goran Stevanović 25 December 2017 – 14 June 2018
  Aleksandar Kristić 14 June 2018 – 23 December 2019
  Zhu Jiong 23 December 2019 – 18 January 2021
  Yin Tiesheng 19 January 2021–12 February 2022
  Antonio Carreño  13 February 2022–

Honours
Qingdao Jonoon's first trophy was the Chinese Yi League Champions, which it won as Shandong Economic and Trade Commission in 1992. In 1995, the club won its first international honour as Qingdao Hainiu – the Thailand Queen's Cup third place. In 2002, the club won its first major trophy – the China FA Cup, which allowed to enter the Chinese FA Super Cup where they came Runners-up that season.

Domestic
FA Cup Winners: 1
 2002
Super Cup Runners-up: 1
 2002
Jia-B League Champions: 1
 1994
Jia-B League Runners-up: 2
 1993, 1996
Yi League Champions: 1
 1992
Reserve team:
Coca-Cola Olympic League Champions: 2
 1998, 1999
Youth team:
U19 FA Cup Winners: 1
 2006

International
Queen's Cup Third places: 1
 1995

Player honours
Chinese Football Association Young Player of the Year
The following players have won the Chinese Football Association Young Player of the Year award while playing for Qingdao Yizhong Hainiu:
 Qu Bo – 2000
The following players have won the Chinese Football Association Young Player of the Year award while playing for Qingdao Jonoon:
 Song Wenjie – 2012
Top Scorer of 2010 East Asian Football Championship
The following players have won the Top Scorer of 2010 East Asian Football Championship award while playing for Qingdao Jonoon:
 Qu Bo – 2010
Best 11 in the Chinese Football Association Team of the year
The following players have won the Best 11 in the Chinese Football Association Team of the year award while playing for Qingdao Yizhong Hainiu:
 Chen Gang – 1999, DF
The following players have won the Best 11 in the Chinese Football Association Team of the year award while playing for Qingdao Jonoon:
 Liu Jian – 2007, MF
 Qu Bo – 2009, FW

Results
All-time league rankings

As of the end of 2019 season.

: In final group stage. : No promotion. : 2 points each win. : No relegation.: Deducted 7 points.: Deducted 6 points.

Queen's Cup results

Key
 Pld = Played
 W = Games won
 D = Games drawn
 L = Games lost
 F = Goals for
 A = Goals against
 Pts = Points
 Pos = Final position

 DNQ = Did not qualify
 DNE = Did not enter
 NH = Not Held
- = Does Not Exist
 R1 = Round 1
 R2 = Round 2
 R3 = Round 3
 R4 = Round 4

 F = Final
 SF = Semi-finals
 QF = Quarter-finals
 R16 = Round of 16
 Group = Group stage
 GS2 = Second Group stage
 QR1 = First Qualifying Round
 QR2 = Second Qualifying Round
 QR3 = Third Qualifying Round

All-time top scorers

Since 1994 the first professional league season. CFA Cup and CSL Cup are included. Correct as the end of season 2011.

Top league scorers each season
Since 1994 the first professional league season. Correct as of 2 July 2012.

Records

Team records

Matches
First Jia-B League match: Shandong Economic and Trade Commission 3–0 Jiangsu, 17 January 1993
First Professional League match: Qingdao Manatee 3–2 Henan Construction, 17 April 1994
First Jia-A League match: Guangzhou Apollo 1–0 Qingdao Manatee, 16 April 1995
First FA Cup match: Qingdao Manatee 0–1 Liaoning Dongyao, 25 June 1995
First Super Cup match: Qingdao Etsong Hainiu 0–1 Dalian Shide, 6 February 2003
First Super League match: Qingdao Etsong Hainiu 2–2 Shanghai International, 16 May 2004
First League Cup match: Qingdao Etsong Hainiu 2–1 Liaoning Zhongyu, 2 June 2004

Record wins
Record win: 6–1 v Chongqing Lifan, Super League, 8 August 2009
Record League win: 6–1 v Chongqing Lifan, Super League, 8 August 2009
Record Super League win: 6–1 v Chongqing Lifan, 8 August 2009
Record FA Cup win: 4–0
v Guizhou Zhicheng, 27 June 2012
Record League home win: 6–1 v Chongqing Lifan, Super League, 8 August 2009
Record League away win: 5–1 v Changsha Ginde, Super League, 11 October 2008

Record defeats
Record defeat: 0–7 v Chongqing Longxin, 30 May 1999
Record League defeat: 0–5 v Yunnan Hongta, Jia-A League, 10 June 2001
Record Super League defeat: 0–4
v Shandong Luneng, 22 August 2007
v Tianjin Teda, 8 September 2007
v Jiangsu Sainty, 22 August 2010
Record FA Cup defeat: 0–7 v Chongqing Longxin, 30 May 1999
Record League home defeat: 0–4 v Shandong Luneng, Super League, 22 August 2007
Record League away defeat: 0–5 v Yunnan Hongta, Jia-A League, 10 June 2001

Player records
Most goals in a season in all competition: 12 – Qu Bo, Super League, 2009
Most League goals in a season: 12 – Qu Bo, Super League, 2009
Top scorer with fewest goals in a season: 4 – Zhang Jun, Jia-A League, 1997
Most goals scored in a match: 3 – Jiang Ning v Chongqing Lifan, 29 March 2006
Fastest Goal: 20 seconds – Peng Weijun v Yunnan Hongta, 2 April 2000
First hat-trick: Jiang Ning v Chongqing Lifan, 29 March 2006

Notable players
Had international caps for their respective countries.

Asia
 Ildar Magdeev
 Aziz Ibragimov
 Sherzod Karimov
 George Mourad
 Joel Griffiths
Africa
 Mark Williams
 James Phiri
 Benedict Akwuegbu
 Abdoul-Aziz Nikiema
Europe
 Miroslav Bičanić
 Oleksandr Holovko
 Aleksandar Rodić
 Ninoslav Milenković
Central & North America
 Mitchel Brown
 Luis Santamaría
 Mauricio Castillo
 Osman Chávez
 Jorge Claros
 Eddie Hernández
South America
 Adrián Paz

References

External links
Official Qingdao Jonoon Football Club website
Official Qingdao Jonoon Group
1994–2003 Qingdao F.C. players' appearance statistics

 
Football clubs in China
Sport in Qingdao
1990 establishments in China
Association football clubs established in 1990